This page lists public opinion polls conducted for the 2018 Hungarian parliamentary election, which was held on 8 April 2018.

The date range for these opinion polls are from the previous general election, held on 6 April 2014.

Graphical summary

(Missing data by Századvég about MKKP and MM were counted in the average as 0.)

Poll results 
Methodological note: The Hungarian pollsters generally release separate data about the support of political parties among all eligible voters (which tends to include a high percentage for "don't know/no preference"), and about the support of political parties among "active" or "certain" voters. The table below refers to the latter data.

Poll results are listed in the table below in reverse chronological order, showing the most recent first, and using the date the survey's fieldwork was done, as opposed to the date of publication. If such date is unknown, the date of publication is given instead. The highest percentage figure in each polling survey is displayed in bold, and the background shaded in the leading party's colour. In the instance that there is a tie, then no figure is shaded. The lead column on the right shows the percentage-point difference between the two parties with the highest figures. When a specific poll does not show a data figure for a party, the party's cell corresponding to that poll is shown empty.

Party preference by age group

2016

Preferred Prime Minister polling 
Some opinion pollsters have asked voters which party leader they would prefer as Prime Minister.

Constituency polls

2018 

{| class="wikitable mw-collapsible mw-collapsed" style="text-align:center"
! colspan="11" style="width: 980pt;" |Budapest 01. OEVK - Districts: I., V., VIII., IX.
|-
! rowspan="3" style="width: 80pt;" |Fieldwork date
! rowspan="3" style="width: 80pt;" |Polling firm
! style="width: 100pt;" |FIDESZ-KDNP
! style="width: 100pt;" |MSZP-P
! style="width: 100pt;" |JOBBIK
! style="width: 100pt;" |LMP
! style="width: 100pt;" |DK
! style="width: 100pt;" |EGYÜTT
! style="width: 100pt;" |MOMENTUM
! style="width: 100pt;" |MKKP
! rowspan="3" style="width: 20pt;" |Lead
|-
! style="background:;" |
! style="background:;" |
! style="background:;" |
! style="background:;" |
! style="background:;" |
! style="background:;" |
! style="background:#8E6FCE;" |
! style="background:#808080;" |
|-
|István Hollik
|Márta V. Naszályi
|Pál Losonczy
|Antal Csárdi
|-
|Péter Juhászw/d
|<small>András Fekete-Győrw/d</small>
|András Horváth
|-
!Mar 2018
!Republikon
| style="background:#FFE5B4" |37
| style="background:#FFDDDD" |37
|8
|8
|-
|-
|-
|-
|0
|-
!Feb 2018
!Medián
| style="background:#FFE5B4" |44
|-
|14
|43
|-
|-
|-
|-
| style="background:; color:white;" |1
|-
!Feb 2018
!Medián
| style="background:#FFE5B4" |39
|26
|11
|24
|-
|-
|-
|-
| style="background:; color:white;" |13
|-
!Feb 2018
!Medián
| style="background:#FFE5B4" |37
|23
|10
|16
|-
|-
|13
|-
| style="background:; color:white;" |14
|-
!Feb 2018
!Medián
| style="background:#FFE5B4" |36
|19
|10
|14
|-
|10
|12
|-
| style="background:; color:white;" |17
|-
!Dec 2017
!Republikon
| style="background:#FFE5B4" |50
|8
|6
|12
|-
|14
|6
|3
| style="background:; color:white;" |36
|-
!2017
!Iránytű
| style="background:#FFE5B4" |46
|14
|9
|9
| -
|2
|12
|8
| style="background:; color:white;" |32
|-
!6 Apr 2014
!National Election
! style="background:#FFE5B4" |45.3
!32.6
!7.8
!13.7
!(Unity)!(Unity)!-
!-
! style="background:; color:white;" |12.7
|}w/d - Withdrawn candidate.''

Notes

References

Opinion polling in Hungary